Moe Rocks Terrastock is the second live album released by Moe Tucker. It has only been released in Japan.

Track listing
"Spam Again" – 5:17
"I Wanna" – 3:08
"I'm Sticking With You" – 2:34
"Crackin' Up" – 4:08
"That's B.A.D." – 6:28
"Mey Mersh!" – 2:48
"Fired Up" – 3:07
"Bo Diddley" – 9:23

Personnel
Moe Tucker – guitar, lead vocals
John Sluggett – drums
Greg Beshers – lead guitar, vocals
John Abbey – bass, vocals
Doug Yule – vocals, piano on track 3, guitar on track 4

Maureen Tucker albums
2002 live albums